The anime series Pita-Ten is based on the manga series of the same name by Koge-Donbo. The series is directed by Toshifumi Kawase and Yuzo Sato and produced by Madhouse. Nine DVDs were released by Bandai Visual in limited and regular editions between June 25, 2002 and April 25, 2003. The first DVD contained the first two episodes, and the other DVD volumes had three episodes each. Two pieces of theme music were used for the series: one opening theme and one ending theme.



Episode list

Media release

References

Pita-Ten